Chinese classic herbal formulas are combinations of herbs used in Chinese herbology for supposed greater efficiency in comparison to individual herbs. They are the basic herbal formulas that students of Traditional Chinese medicine learn. Later these students will adapt these classic formulas to match the needs of each patient.

History
Many of these formulas were created by the pioneers of Chinese medicine and are quite old.  For example, "Liu Wei Di Huang Wan" (六味地黄丸 liùwèi dìhuáng wán) was developed by Qian Yi ( Qián Yǐ) (c. 1032–1113 CE).  It was published in the "Xiao'er Yao Zheng Zhi Jue" (also known as "Key to Therapeutics of Children's Diseases"  xiǎoér yào zhèng zhí jué) in 1119 by Qian Yi's student.

Modern use
Many of these formulas are still made in the form of Chinese patent medicine. These formulas are also used in kampo (traditional Japanese medicine). In Japan, herbalists do not create medicine for each patient. Instead the herbalist will choose an herbal formula that has been standardized by the Japanese government. These formulas are based on the Chinese classic herbal formulas. However, they often vary slightly. Sometimes Chinese plants are substituted for plants found in Japan, or the proportions of the formula are changed slightly.

Manufacturer list

The top 5 manufacturers in Taiwan

Sun-ten
Chuang Song Zong Pharmaceutical Co., Ltd. (莊松榮)
Shen Chang
Kaiser
Ko-da

List
There are hundreds of Chinese classic herbal formulas. Many are slight variations of other formula however. It is difficult to define which of these formulas are the most common. The two leading brands to export Chinese classic herbal formulas in the form of Chinese patent medicine from China are Mín Shān and Plum Flower. Some of these formulas are made by these 2 brands.

See also
 Kampo, Japanese adaptation of Chinese medicine
 Traditional Chinese medicine
 Chinese patent medicine

Notes

External links
Chinese Herbal Medicine
Chinese Herbal Medicine
Chinese Medicine Ordinance, Chapter 549, Schedule 2 (Hong Kong)
 Chinese Medicine Formulae Images Database  School of Chinese Medicine, Hong Kong Baptist University. (in English and Chinese)
 Chinese Medicinal Material Images Database   School of Chinese Medicine, Hong Kong Baptist University. (in English and Chinese)
 Medicinal Plant Images Database  School of Chinese Medicine, Hong Kong Baptist University. (in English and Chinese)
 Phytochemical Images Database  School of Chinese Medicine, Hong Kong Baptist University. (in English and Chinese)
 Chinese Medicine Specimen Database  School of Chinese Medicine, Hong Kong Baptist University. (in English and Chinese)